Tim Baker may refer to:

 Tim Baker (American football) (born 1977), American football player 
 Tim Baker (journalist), Australian journalist
 Tim Baker (musician), Canadian singer-songwriter

See also
 Timothy D. Baker (1925–2013), American professor of international health
 Tim Barker (disambiguation)
 Tom Baker (disambiguation)